Empire Outlets New York City is a  retail complex in the St. George neighborhood of Staten Island in New York City. Construction on Empire Outlets started in 2015, and the complex opened on May 15, 2019. Tentative plans called for 100 stores, but there is only space for about 70 stores, less than half of which are currently occupied. 
It is the first outlet mall in New York City. The mall is located next to the St. George Terminal, a major ferry, train, and bus hub.

Facilities
The  mall, the city's first outlet mall, was to feature 100 designer outlet stores and a  hotel with 200 rooms as it originally was approved. There are also  of outdoor space with a staircase leading to a green roof. The mall includes a 1,200-space underground parking lot, as well as 22 escalators and 21 elevators. , tenants leasing significant amounts of space included H&M, Nordstrom Rack, Nike Factory, and Gap Inc.'s subsidiaries Banana Republic and Old Navy.

Empire Outlets is located near St. George Terminal and Richmond County Bank Ballpark. The two projects initially went through the approval process simultaneously and shared consultants on issues such as traffic and the waterfront, but were separate projects with separate funding.

History

Construction on Empire Outlets started in 2015. BFC Partners, based in Brooklyn, constructed Empire Outlets under the auspices of the developer, an Economic Development Corp named Empire Outlets Builders, LLC. SHoP Architects provided architectural design services; DeSimone Consulting Engineers was the structural engineering firm; and Casandra Properties and EB were the leasing agents.

The original opening date for Empire Outlets was scheduled for fall 2017. However, in early 2017, the opening was delayed to March 2018 in order to coincide with the New York Wheel's opening. Later that year, the mall's opening was delayed again to late 2018. By July 2018, the mall was mostly complete, and was projected to open that November. However, in September 2018, the mall's opening date was postponed again, this time to spring 2019. The mall's opening date was later set at May 15, 2019.

Even though the grand opening was held on May 15, most retailers would open on a staggered schedule through mid-2019. By November 2019, there were thirty stores operating at Empire Outlets, and hundreds of thousands of visitors had traveled to the mall, with international tourists making up almost two-thirds of all spending at Empire Outlets. This, in turn, increased international spending on Staten Island by almost 50%. A 600-seat beer garden and a food market were expected to further increase visitation to Empire Outlets once they opened in early 2020, which they never did. In February 2022, Empire Outlets went into foreclosure; it owed $38 million to Sterling National Bank and $174 million to Urban Investment Group.

Ferry terminal
In January 2019, NYC Ferry announced that it would start operating its St. George route in 2020. The route opened in 2021 and runs from the St. George Terminal to Battery Park City Ferry Terminal and West Midtown Ferry Terminal in Manhattan. However, due to concerns that the massive Staten Island Ferry boats and the small NYC Ferry craft might not be able to share a dock, the New York City Economic Development Corporation announced in January 2020 that a NYC Ferry dock would instead be built close to the existing terminal, at Empire Outlets closer to the Richmond County Bank Ballpark. The St. George ferry stop began operating in August 2021.

References

External links

 
 Empire Outlets Celebrates Groundbreaking on Staten Island's North Shore

2019 establishments in New York City
Commercial buildings in Staten Island
History of Staten Island
Shopping malls in New York City
St. George, Staten Island
Tourist attractions in Staten Island
Shopping malls established in 2019